Hong Ren, who is also known as Hongren, (Chinese: 弘仁; 1610–1663) was a Chinese Buddhist monk and painter of the early Qing dynasty and a member of the Anhui (or Xin'an) school of painting. His birth name was Jiang Fang. After the fall of the Ming dynasty, he became a monk, as did his artistic contemporaries, Zhu Da, Shitao, and Kun Can. They protested the fall of the Ming dynasty by becoming monks. Hong Ren's style has been said to "[represent] the world in a dematerialized, cleansed version ... revealing his personal peace through the liberating form of geometric abstraction."

References

External links
China-on-site.com brief summary
Hongren on the Museum of Fine Arts Boston Internet Site

1610 births
1664 deaths
17th-century Chinese painters
Buddhist artists
Chinese Zen Buddhists
Ming dynasty Buddhist monks
Ming dynasty painters
Qing dynasty Buddhist monks
Qing dynasty painters